Nick Mohammed (29 January 1926 – 11 March 2011) was a Canadian wrestler. He competed in the men's freestyle welterweight at the 1952 Summer Olympics.

References

External links
 

1926 births
2011 deaths
Canadian male sport wrestlers
Olympic wrestlers of Canada
Wrestlers at the 1952 Summer Olympics
20th-century Canadian people